A labor camp (or labour camp, see spelling differences) or work camp is a detention facility where inmates are forced to engage in penal labor as a form of punishment. Labor camps have many common aspects with slavery and with prisons (especially prison farms). Conditions at labor camps vary widely depending on the operators. Convention no. 105 of the United Nations International Labour Organization (ILO), adopted internationally on 27 June 1957, abolished camps of forced labor.

In the 20th century, a new category of labor camps developed for the imprisonment of millions of people who were not criminals per se, but political opponents (real or imagined) and various so-called undesirables under communist and fascist regimes. Some of those camps were dubbed "reeducation facilities" for political coercion, but most others served as backbones of industry and agriculture for the benefit of the state, especially in times of war.

Precursors 
Early-modern states could exploit condemned dissidents and those of suspect political or religious ideology by combining prison and useful work in manning their galleys.
This became the sentence of many Christian captives in the Ottoman Empire
and of Calvinists (Huguenots) in pre-Revolutionary France.

Labor camps in the 20th century

Albania

Allies of World War II
 The Allies of World War II operated a number of work camps after the war. At the Yalta Conference in 1945, it was agreed that German forced labor was to be utilized as reparations. The majority of the camps were in the Soviet Union, but more than one million Germans were forced to work in French coal-mines and British agriculture, as well as 500,000 in US-run Military Labor Service Units in occupied Germany itself. See Forced labor of Germans after World War II.

Bulgaria

Burma
According to the New Statesman, Burmese military government operated, from 1962 to 2011, about 91 labour camps for political prisoners.

China
The anti-communist Kuomintang operated various camps between 1938 and 1949, including the Northwestern Youth Labor Camp for young activists and students.
The Chinese Communist Party has operated many labor camps for some crimes at least since taking power in 1949. Many leaders of China were put into labor camps after purges, including Deng Xiaoping and Liu Shaoqi. May Seventh Cadre Schools are an example of Cultural Revolution-era labor camps.
Xinjiang internment camps

Cuba
 Beginning in November 1965, people classified as "against the government" were summoned to work camps referred to as "Military Units to Aid Production" (UMAP).

Czechoslovakia
 After the communists took over Czechoslovakia in 1948, many forced labor camps were created. The inmates included political prisoners, clergy, kulaks, Boy Scout leaders and many other groups of people that were considered enemies of the state. About half of the prisoners worked in the uranium mines. These camps lasted until 1961.
 Also between 1950 and 1954 many men were considered "politically unreliable" for compulsory military service, and were conscripted to labour battalions (Czech: Pomocné technické prapory (PTP)) instead.

Italian Libya
 During the colonisation of Libya the Italians deported most of the Libyan population in Cyrenaica to concentration camps and used the survivors to build in semi-slave conditions the coastal road and new agricultural projects.

Nazi Germany

 During World War II the Nazis operated several categories of Arbeitslager (Labor Camps) for different categories of inmates. The largest number of them held Jewish civilians forcibly abducted in the occupied countries (see Łapanka) to provide labor in the German war industry, repair bombed railroads and bridges or work on farms. By 1944, 19.9% of all workers were foreigners, either civilians or prisoners of war.
The Nazis employed many slave laborers. They also operated concentration camps, some of which provided free forced labor for industrial and other jobs while others existed purely for the extermination of their inmates. A notable example is the Mittelbau-Dora labor camp complex that serviced the production of the V-2 rocket. See List of German concentration camps for more.
The Nazi camps played a key role in the extermination of millions.

Imperial Japan
 During the early 20th century, the Empire of Japan used the forced labor of millions of civilians from conquered countries and prisoners of war, especially during the Second Sino-Japanese War and the Pacific War, on projects such as the Death Railway. Hundreds of thousands of people died as a direct result of the overwork, malnutrition, preventable disease and violence which were commonplace on these projects.

North Korea
North Korea is known to operate six camps with prison-labor colonies in remote mountain valleys. The total number of prisoners in the Kwan-li-so is 150,000 to 200,000. Once condemned as a political criminal in North Korea, the defendant and his family are incarcerated for life in one of the camps without trial and cut off from all outside contact.
See also: North Korean prison system

Romania

Russia and the Soviet Union

 Imperial Russia operated a system of remote Siberian forced labor camps as part of its regular judicial system, called katorga.

 The Soviet Union took over the already extensive katorga system and expanded it immensely, eventually organizing the Gulag to run the camps. In 1954, a year after Stalin's death, the new Soviet government of Nikita Khrushchev began to release political prisoners and close down the camps. By the end of the 1950s, virtually all "corrective labor camps" were reorganized, mostly into the system of corrective labor colonies. Officially, the Gulag was terminated by the MVD order 20 of January 25, 1960.

 During the period of Stalinism, the Gulag labor camps in the Soviet Union were officially called "Corrective labor camps". The term "labor colony"; more exactly, "Corrective labor colony", (abbr. ИТК), was also in use, most notably the ones for underaged (16 years or younger) convicts and captured besprizorniki (street children, literally, "children without family care"). After the reformation of the camps into the Gulag, the term "corrective labor colony" essentially encompassed labor camps.

Russian Federation

Sweden

 14 labor camps were operated by the Swedish state during World War II. The majority of internees were communists, but radical social democrats, syndicalists, anarchists, trade unionists, anti-fascists and other "unreliable elements" of Swedish society, as well as German dissidents and deserters from the Wehrmacht, were also interned. The internees were placed in the labor camps indefinitely, without trial, and without being informed of the accusations made against them. Officially, the camps were called "labor companies" (Swedish: arbetskompanier). The system was established by the Royal Board of Social Affairs and sanctioned by the third cabinet of Per Albin Hansson, a grand coalition which included all parties represented in the Swedish Riksdag, with the notable exception of the Communist Party of Sweden.

 After the war, many former camp inmates had difficulty finding a job, since they had been branded as "subversive elements".

Turkey

United States
During the United States occupation of Haiti, the United States Marine Corps and their Gendarmerie of Haiti subordinates enforced a corvée system upon Haitians. The corvée resulted in the deaths of hundreds to thousands of Haitians, with Haitian American academic Michel-Rolph Trouillot estimating that about 5,500 Haitians died in labor camps. In addition, Roger Gaillard writes that some Haitians were killed fleeing the camps or if they did not work satisfactorily.

Vietnam

Yugoslavia
 The Goli Otok prison camp for political opponents ran from 1946 to 1956.

Labor camps in the 21st century

China
 The Standing Committee of the National People's Congress of the People's Republic of China, which closed on December 28, 2013, passed a decision on abolishing the legal provisions on reeducation through labor. However, penal labor allegedly continues to exist in Xinjiang re-education camps according to Radio Free Asia.

North Korea
 North Korea is known to operate six camps with prison-labor colonies in remote mountain valleys. The total number of prisoners in the Kwan-li-so is 150,000 – 200,000. Once condemned as a political criminal in North Korea, the defendant and his family are incarcerated for lifetime in one of the camps without trial, and are cut off from all outside contact.

United States
In 1997, a United States Army document was developed that "provides guidance on establishing prison camps on [US] Army installations."

See also
 Chain gang
 Civilian Inmate Labor Program
 Extermination through labor
 Memorial (society)
 Penal colony
 Subjugate

References

External links
 
 

Internments
Camp
Total institutions